Miloš Juhász (born 3 January 1984) is a Slovak football midfielder.

References

External links
The Home Of FK Senica 3 at fksenica.sk 

1984 births
Living people
Slovak footballers
Association football midfielders
FC Spartak Trnava players
FK Senica players
Spartak Myjava players
Slovak Super Liga players